The qualifying competition for the 2010 Caribbean Championship was a football tournament held from 2 October to 14 November 2010 to determine the qualifying teams for the 2010 Caribbean Championship. 21 teams entered the qualifying competition (hosts Martinique and title holders Jamaica automatically qualified), with six teams qualifying for the final tournament. The tournament was played over two rounds. In the first round, the 15 lowest ranked teams competed in three groups of four and one group of three in a round-robin. The winners of the four groups and the two best runners-up of the three groups of four advanced to the second round. In the second round, the six qualifying teams from the first round joined the second through seventh highest ranked teams from the 2008 Caribbean Championship to compete in three groups of four in a round-robin. The two best teams from each group advanced to join Martinique and Jamaica in the final tournament.

First round
The four group winners along with the two best second-place teams from Groups A, B, and C advanced to Qualifying Group Stage Two.

Tiebreakers (apply to all group stages)
 Greater number of points in matches between the tied teams.
 Greater goal difference in matches between the tied teams (if more than two teams finish equal on points).
 Greater number of goals scored in matches among the tied teams (if more than two teams finish equal on points).
 Greater goal difference in all group matches.
 Greater number of goals scored in all group matches.
 Drawing of lots.

Group A
Played in Puerto Rico from 2–6 October.

Group B
Played in Saint Vincent and the Grenadines from 6–10 October.

Saint Kitts and Nevis ranked ahead of Saint Vincent and Barbados based on head-to-head tiebreaker.  The 3 matches played among the teams were all draws; Saint Kitts and Nevis scored more goals (2) than Saint Vincent and Barbados (1 each) in those matches.

Group C
Played in Suriname from 13–17 October.

Group D

Played in Dominican Republic from 14–17 October.
Note – Dominican Republic vs British Virgin Islands was scheduled for 13 October but was postponed by one day due to the late arrival of the British Virgin Islands.

Only the group winner could advance to the next stage.

Ranking of Group Runners-up
The top two second place sides from Groups A, B, and C advanced to Qualifying Stage Two.

Second round
The 2nd through 7th ranked teams from the 2008 tournament (Jamaica, the 2008 winner, qualified directly to  the final round) are automatically qualified for this round: Antigua and Barbuda, Cuba, Grenada,  Guadeloupe, Haiti, and Trinidad and Tobago.
The three group winners along with the three second-place teams qualified for the Final Tournament.

Group E
Played in Grenada from 22–26 October.

Group F
Played in Trinidad and Tobago from 2–6 November.

Group G
Played in Antigua and Barbuda from 10–14 November.

References

Caribbean Championship qualifying
Qualification